Qualis is a Brazilian official system with the purpose of classifying scientific production. It is maintained by the Coordenadoria de Aperfeiçoamento de Pessoal de Nível Superior (CAPES), a government agency linked to the Brazilian Ministry of Education.

Qualis has the task to classify and evaluate the academic means used on the  production of scientific publications of post-graduate programs (such as master theses and doctoral dissertations). The classification itself occurs by a system of grades, per field of evaluation, and depends on the level of circulation (local, national or international) and on the quality of the journal (A, B, or C).

Grades 
The classification is annually updated and follows a series of criteria defined by CAPES, such as: number of issues, indexation, number of publishing institutions, impact factor based on JCR, etc. The grades (so called "strata") occur in a 1–8 scale (A1, the highest; A2; B1; B2; B3; B4; B5; C — not listed).

See also
 Lattes Platform
 Journal ranking by country

References

Further reading 
 Ribeiro, R. J., "Brazil", chap.7 in Maresi Nerad and Mimi Heggelund (Eds.) Toward a global PhD?: forces and forms in doctoral education worldwide, University of Washington Press, 2011, 353 pages. 
 Delgado-Troncoso, J.E. and Fischman, G.E., "The future of Latin American journals", chap.16 in Bill Cope and Angus Phillips (Eds.) The Future of the Academic Journal, Chandos Publishing, 2014, 478 pages. 
 Metze, K. "Bureaucrats, researchers, editors, and the impact factor - a vicious circle that is detrimental to science, Clinics, 65:10, doi:10.1590/S1807-59322010001000002 
 Rocha-e-Silva, M. "Impact factor, scimago indexes and the Brazilian journal rating system: where do we go from here?" Clinics, 65:4, doi:10.1590/S1807-59322010000400001

External links 
  

Government agencies of Brazil
Higher education in Brazil
Bibliographic databases and indexes
Databases in Brazil